Jack William Suwinski (born July 29, 1998) is an American professional baseball outfielder for the Pittsburgh Pirates of Major League Baseball (MLB).

Early life and amateur career
Jack Suwinski is the third child of parents Tim and Ann  Suwinski. He has two elder sisters, Natalie and Heidi. Suwinski began playing on a travel team for baseball at the age of nine. He attended Taft High School in Chicago, Illinois. Suwinski committed to play college baseball at Indiana University.

Professional career

San Diego Padres
Suwinski was drafted by the San Diego Padres in the 15th round of the 2016 Major League Baseball draft, and chose to sign for a bonus of $550,000. He made his professional debut with the rookie-level AZL Padres. In 2017, Suwinski played for the Single-A Fort Wayne Tin Caps, slashing .227/.319/.349 with 9 home runs and 41 RBI in 125 games with the team. He returned to the team in 2018, playing in 111 games and posting a slash of .255/.324/.408 with 10 home runs and 57 RBI. For the 2019 season, Suwinski played for the High-A Lake Elsinore Storm, hitting .208/.303/.351 with a career-high 12 home runs and 51 RBI. Suwinski did not play in a game in 2020 due to the cancellation of the minor league season because of the COVID-19 pandemic. He began the 2021 season with the Double-A San Antonio Missions, batting .262/.383/.485 with 15 home runs and 37 RBI in 66 games.

Pittsburgh Pirates
On July 26, 2021, the Padres traded Suwinski, Tucupita Marcano, and Michell Miliano to the Pittsburgh Pirates in exchange for Adam Frazier. Suwinski finished the year with the Double-A Altoona Curve, batting .252/.359/.391 with 4 home runs and 21 RBI in 45 games. Following the season, on November 19, 2021, the Pirates added Suwinski to their 40-man roster.

On April 26, 2022, Suwinski was promoted to the major leagues for the first time after Bryan Reynolds and Cole Tucker were placed on the COVID injured list. He made his MLB debut that day as the starting right fielder against the Milwaukee Brewers, notching a two-out single for his first big league hit. Suwinski hit his first home run while facing the Los Angeles Dodgers on May 9. On June 4, he connected on a walk-off home run against the Arizona Diamondbacks. Suwinski hit three home runs during his first career multi-homer game on June 19. The last home run of the game ensured a walk-off victory for the Pirates against the San Francisco Giants. It was the first time in Major League Baseball history that a rookie had a three home run game that also included a walk-off home run.

References

External links

1998 births
Living people
American people of Slavic descent
Baseball players from Chicago
Major League Baseball outfielders
Pittsburgh Pirates players
Arizona League Padres players
Fort Wayne TinCaps players
Lake Elsinore Storm players
San Antonio Missions players
Altoona Curve players